Meds is the fifth studio album by British alternative rock band Placebo. It was recorded from late 2005 to early 2006 and released on 13 March 2006 by record label Virgin in most countries, although it was released three days earlier in Australia and New Zealand. Illegal copies had previously been available on the Internet since 17 January 2006.

Meds reached number 7 in the UK Albums Chart, and received a generally favourable reaction from music critics. It also became Placebo's first album to chart on the US Billboard 200, where it reached number 180. Four singles were released from the album: "Because I Want You", "Song to Say Goodbye", "Infra-Red" and "Meds". This is the band's final album to featured the original drummer Steve Hewitt.

Content 

Placebo had planned to record a more electronic, keyboard-driven sound for their new album; however, producer Dimitri Tikovoi suggested a back-to-basics approach, which Brian Molko recounted in Zero:
It was our producer's agenda really, which we didn't really know about until we got into the studio. [...] We were in a place that was very much about samplers and computers and vintage synthesizers. This recording session really became about playing again. We were in an old-school studio so there were no real tricks to hide behind.

On the theme of the record, Molko says:

I think there's a lot of songs about the dangers and effects of drinking [alcohol]. [...] "Infra-Red"'s about that, when you get very drunk and you've got a bee in your bonnet about something, and this vengeful quality emerges. You start thinking about people who've done you wrong and [want] to set the record straight.

Release 

Meds was released 13 March 2006 worldwide, although it was released three days earlier in Australia and New Zealand. Illegal copies had previously been available on the Internet since 17 January 2006. It reached number 7 in the UK Albums Chart.

The album was re-released by Virgin in the United States in January 2007 with three extra tracks—"Lazarus", "UNEEDMEMORETHANINEEDU" (both B-sides to the "Meds" single) and "Running Up That Hill"—and "In the Cold Light of Morning" omitted (because it contains "dirty words"). The album was released with the Copy Control protection system in some regions. The Chilean two-disc edition includes a bonus disc of live tracks recorded at the Centro Cultural Estación Mapocho, Santiago on 1 and 2 April 2005, entitled Live in Chile.

The US release version has different arrangements of various tracks; e.g. it omits the glockenspiel during "Pierrot the Clown", giving a much more bare-bones version of the song.

Reception 

Meds received a generally favourable reception from critics, though several reviewers commented on the album's lack of divergence from the group's established sound.

Pitchfork reviewer Joe Tangari opined "the arrangements and recordings are so airtight you could suffocate in them, with the distortion strictly compressed and neatly controlled". Tangari finished by commenting "Meds isn't a terrible album, but there's very little to get excited about on it either, and Placebo's calculated naughtiness is no more convincing than it's ever been." Jonathan Keefe of Slant wrote "Meds finds a successful band doing just a little to tinker with their proven formula [...] and attempting to pass off a few too many soundalike tracks as thematic coherence". Dan Raper of PopMatters wrote "Meds is cloaked in the sophisticated sheen of a band completely established; pushing in some areas, content to rely on established constructions and melodic elements in others. If you haven't experienced the familiar cycle of infatuation–disappointment–indifference with Placebo, you could find these songs pleasant, at times even exhilarating. But I've just reached the final stage of that cycle, and nothing here forces me to reconsider."

MacKenzie Wilson of AllMusic called Meds "as bare and honest as Placebo have ever been, thanks to French producer Dimitri Tikovoi's straightforward approach in getting the band to make a bona fide rock record", writing that "There's a fresh vulnerability here and a sense of danger, too". Robert Christgau, while mixed in his reception, called Meds "easily their most effective album-as-album", while Q magazine called it "easily their most focused album to date". musicOMH wrote "Darker than its predecessors, the harrowing Meds is as close Placebo have come to that perfect album."

Speaking to Kerrang! in June 2009, Brian Molko remembered: "This was the beginning of the end of the band [drummer Steve Hewitt left after its release] and the way we dealt with that was by anaesthetizing ourselves to the max. When Stef and I hear tracks from the album we look at each other and go, 'Erm… who played what on this song?' There are moments on there like "[In the] Cold Light of Morning," that are painful to listen to now. I don't know that we've ever been that down before. I think it's a very powerful record, emotionally, and despite the circumstances under which it was made, it's quite perfectly executed. It's just very dark and doesn't offer very much hope."

Track listing 

 US version

 Special Edition bonus DVD

 Lyrics in virtual booklet
 "The Death of Nancy Boy" (documentary) – 8:51
 "Twenty Years" (live at Wembley 05.11.04) (video) – 6:05
 "If Only Tonight We Could Sleep" (featuring The Cure) (video) – 4:06
 "Backstage at Live 8" – 4:19
 "Long Division" – 2:44
 "In the Cold Light of Morning" (demo) – 4:27
 "I Do" (demo) – 2:32
 "Pierrot the Clown" (demo) – 4:58

Personnel 

 Placebo

 Brian Molko – guitar, lead vocals, keyboards
 Stefan Olsdal – bass, backing vocals, guitar, keyboard
 Steve Hewitt – drums

 Additional personnel

 Alison Mosshart – vocals on track 1
 Michael Stipe – vocals
 Natalia Bonner – violin on tracks 4, 9 and 13
 Ian Burge – cello on tracks 4, 9 and 13
 Sarah Button – violin on tracks 4, 9 and 13
 Krista Caspersz – violin on tracks 4, 9 and 13
 Reiad Ceibah – viola on tracks 4, 9 and 13
 Fiona Griffiths – viola on tracks 4, 9 and 13
 Gita Langley – violin on tracks 4, 9 and 13
 Vicky Matthews – cello on tracks 4, 9 and 13
 Jessie Murphy – violin on tracks 4, 9 and 13
 Emma Owens – viola on tracks 4, 9 and 13
 Tom Piggot-Smith – violin on tracks 4, 9 and 13
 Helen Rathbone – cello on tracks 4, 9 and 13
 Katherine Shave – viola on tracks 4, 9 and 13
 Ellie Stanford – violin on tracks 4, 9 and 13
 Deborah White – violin on tracks 4, 9 and 13
 Lucy Wilkins – violin on tracks 4, 9 and 13
 Dave Williams – violin on tracks 4, 9 and 13
 Sarah Willson – cello on tracks 4, 9 and 13
 Fiona Brice – string arrangement on tracks 4, 9 and 13

 Technical

 Dimitri Tikovoï – production
 Flood – mixing on tracks 1, 3–6, 8, 9 and 11–13
 Dave Bascombe – mixing on tracks 7 and 10
 James Brown – engineering, mixing on track 2
 Alex Cowper – album design
 Steve Mustarde – engineering assistance at Livingston Studios, London
 Dan Porter – engineering assistance at Townhouse Studios
 Mark Neary – engineering assistance at Snake Ranch
 Rob Smith – engineering assistance at Sarm West Studios
 Richard Woodcraft – engineering assistance at RAK Studios, London
 Raj Das – engineering assistance at RAK Studios
 Tim Young – audio mastering at Metropolis Studios, London
 Marcelo Aldunate – mastering of Live in Chile
 Rubén Cartagena – mixing and recording of Live in Chile
 Daniel Escobar – recording assistance of Live in Chile
 Gonzalo González – mastering of Live in Chile
 Ewen Bremner – documentary film direction and editing
 Side – documentary film sound services
 Kal Weber – documentary film photography and production
 Quinn Williams – documentary film editing
 Gresby Nash – documentary film sound mixing
 Paul Corkett – production on DVD track 6
 Des Fallon – production on DVD track 3
 Nick Fry – direction on DVD track 3
 Pascal Klein – photography on DVD track 5
 Renaud Le Van Kim – direction on DVD track 4
 Placebo – production on DVD track 6
 Simon Williams – editing on DVD track 5

Charts

Weekly charts

Year-end charts

Certifications

References

External links 

 

Placebo (band) albums
2006 albums
Virgin Records albums
Albums produced by Dimitri Tikovoi
Albums recorded at RAK Studios